ISRA or Isra may refer to:
 Al-Isra,  17th chapter of the Quran 
 Islamic Sciences and Research Academy of Australia
 Institut sénégalais de recherches agricoles, the Senegalese Institute for Agricultural Research
 International Society for Research on Aggression, a psychology organization
 International Shari’ah Research Academy for Islamic Finance, a financial research institute in Malaysia
 Isra and Mi'raj, the journey out and home, an Islamic belief